Joshua Varga (born 7 February 2002), is an Australian soccer player who plays as a midfielder for Langwarrin SC. Varga previously played in the A-League Men for Melbourne Victory.

References

External links

2002 births
Living people
Australian soccer players
Association football midfielders
Melbourne City FC players
Melbourne Victory FC players
National Premier Leagues players
A-League Men players
Australian people of Spanish descent
People from the City of Greater Dandenong
Soccer players from Melbourne
Australia youth international soccer players